George Briscoe Kerferd (21 January 1831 – 31 December 1889), Australian colonial politician, was the 10th Premier of Victoria.

Kerferd was born in Liverpool, the son of G. B. Kerferd, a merchant (or Joseph Kerferd, a bookkeeper, and his wife Rachel, née Blundell) Kerferd was educated at the Collegiate Institute, Liverpool, with intentions of studying law; however circumstances led him to enter his father's business. Kerferd emigrated to Victoria in 1853 with plans to open a branch of the family business, but this did not eventuate. After trying his luck as a gold miner at Bendigo, he settled in Beechworth and became a brewer and wine merchant. He was mayor of Beechworth 1863-64 and three other occasions. In 1853 he married Ann Martindale, with whom he had ten children. Kerferd was admitted to the Melbourne bar in 1867 but did not practise as a lawyer.

Kerferd was elected to the Legislative Assembly for the Ovens in November 1864, and represented the area continuously until February 1886. 
He began studying law in 1864 and was Minister for Mines and Vice-President of the Board of Land and Works in the government of James McCulloch 1868, and Solicitor-General 1872–1874, and Attorney-General in 1874 in the government of James Francis. When the Francis government was defeated in July 1874, Kerferd succeeded him at the head of a new conservative ministry.

Kerferd's Treasurer, James Service, was, like most colonial conservatives, a convinced free trader, and the government's 1875 budget proposed repealing the tariffs imposed by Charles Gavan Duffy's liberal government, and replacing the lost revenue with a land tax and a tax on beer and spirits. But this offended both the landowners and the business community, and Kerferd's government was defeated in August 1875.

Kerferd was again appointed as Attorney-General in later conservative governments (1875–1877, 1880 and 1883–86, in the Service government). In 1883 Kerferd was a Victorian representative to the federal convention. In 1886, he quit politics and on 1 January 1886 was appointed to the Supreme Court of Victoria. The appointment was not without controversy as several barristers had served longer in the legal profession, but Kerferd had eight years as attorney-general. There was general agreement that Kerferd filled his role as judge with great ability. Kerferd served as a judge until his death in 1889 while on a holiday at Sorrento, Victoria.

Kerferd Road in Albert Park is named after him.
Kerferd Road, later Avenue, in Sorrento is also named after him.

See also
 Judiciary of Australia
 List of Judges of the Supreme Court of Victoria
 Victorian Bar Association

References
Geoff Browne, A Biographical Register of the Victorian Parliament, 1900-84, Government Printer, Melbourne, 1985
Don Garden, Victoria: A History, Thomas Nelson, Melbourne, 1984
Kathleen Thompson and Geoffrey Serle, A Biographical Register of the Victorian Parliament, 1856-1900, Australian National University Press, Canberra, 1972
Raymond Wright, A People's Counsel. A History of the Parliament of Victoria, 1856-1990, Oxford University Press, Melbourne, 1992

External links

 Supreme Court of Victoria Website
 

1831 births
1889 deaths
Premiers of Victoria
Judges of the Supreme Court of Victoria
Australian federationists
English emigrants to colonial Australia
Victoria (Australia) state politicians
Politicians from Liverpool
Attorneys-General of the Colony of Victoria
Solicitors-General of Victoria
Colony of Victoria judges
19th-century Australian politicians
Australian brewers
Australian wine and spirit merchants
19th-century Australian businesspeople